Better Than Sex is a 1999 album by the Red Elvises.

Track listing 
All songs written by Zhenya Kolykhanov. 
Red Lips, Red Eyes, Red Stockings
Hanky Panky Kind of Love
Wild Man
Painted Love
Joint Was Jumping
Wonderful Night
To the Top
Strip Joint is Closed
Closet Disco Dancer
Jumping Cat Boogie
Mamasita

Credits 

Igor Yuzov - vocals, guitar
Zhenya Kolykhanov - Guitar, Piano, Vocals, Cover Art
Oleg Bernov - Bass, vocals
Avi Sills - drums
Chelyapov Edelman - Clarinet, Piano, Saxophone
Galina Glek-Shlimovich - Violin
Chris Golden - Guitar (Bass), Contrabass
Leo Groovitz - Clarinet, Saxophone
Letitia Jones - Vocals
Dmitri Mamokhin - Trumpet
Dianne Sellers - Vocals
Roman Volodarsky - Violin
Alexander Zhyroff - Cello
Barry Connely - Engineer
Svetoslav Lazarov - Engineer
Duncan MacFarlane - Mastering, Mixing
Christy A. Moeller-Masel - Layout, design

External links 
 Official site

Red Elvises albums
1999 albums